The Miles M.7 Nighthawk was a 1930s British training and communications monoplane designed by Miles Aircraft Limited.

Design and development
The M.7 Nighthawk was developed from the Miles Falcon Six intended as a training and communications aircraft. The prototype, registered G-ADXA, was first flown in 1935, it was a low-wing monoplane powered by a 200 hp (149 kW) de Havilland Gipsy Six piston engine. The prototype crashed during spinning trials at Woodley Aerodrome in January 1937. Four production aircraft followed.

The design was modified to meet an Air Ministry specification and produced as the M.16 Mentor. In 1944 a Nighthawk fuselage was fitted with the wings from a Mohawk and fitted with a  de Havilland Gipsy Six Series II engine with a variable pitch airscrew. It was designated the M.7A Nighthawk. The last Nighthawk to remain airworthy was G-AGWT in the early 1960s. This aircraft was raced in many postwar UK air competitions, but is no longer extant.

Operational history
Two aircraft were delivered to the Royal Romanian Air Force in 1936 and one was delivered to the Royal Air Force in May 1937 with serial number L6846. It was used as a VIP transport by No. 24 Squadron RAF.

Variants
M.7
Production version with a 200 hp (149 kW) de Havilland Gipsy Six piston engine, two built.
M.7A
Four-seat variant built for the Romanian Government, two built.
M.7A (Hybrid)
Hybrid version with Nighthawk fuselage and wings from a Mohawk and powered by a  de Havilland Gipsy Six Series II engine, one built.

Operators

Royal Romanian Air Force

Royal Air Force
No. 24 Squadron RAF

Specifications (M.7)

See also

References

Notes

Bibliography

 Brown, Don Lambert. Miles Aircraft Since 1925. London: Putnam & Company Ltd., 1970. .
 Halley, James J. The Squadrons of the Royal Air Force. Tonbridge, Kent, UK: Air-Britain (Historians), 1980. .
 The Illustrated Encyclopedia of Aircraft (Part Work 1982-1985). Orbis Publishing.
 Jackson, A.J. British Civil Aircraft since 1919. London: Putnam, 1974. .
 Jackson, A.J. British Civil Aircraft since 1919, Volume 3. London: Putnam, 1988. .
 "Learning in Luxury: The Miles Nighthawk: A Cabin Monoplane Built Primarily for Instrument- and Night-flying Training". Flight, 20 February 1936, Supplement, pp. c–d.

Nighthawk
1930s British military trainer aircraft
1930s British civil utility aircraft
Single-engined tractor aircraft
Low-wing aircraft
Aircraft first flown in 1935